Coelonia fulvinotata is a moth of the family Sphingidae first described by Arthur Gardiner Butler in 1875. It is known from most habitats throughout the Afrotropical realm, from the Gambia east to Ethiopia and south to northern South Africa and Madagascar.

The length of the forewing is 52–55 mm for males and the wingspan is 101–111 mm. The body and wings are brown, with two bright pink dorsal hair tufts at the base of the abdomen. The forewings are mottled and variegated with lighter brown and dark indistinct wavy lines. The hindwings are darker, with a black basal patch surrounded by a large ochreous yellow patch. Females are larger and darker. The subapical area of forewings is much paler and more conspicuous.

The larvae feed on Lantana camara, Fraxinus floribunda, Clerodendrum heterophyllum, Dahlia variabilis and Duranta plumieri. Adults are pollinators of some species of baobab in Madagascar, including Adansonia za.

Subspecies
Coelonia fulvinotata fulvinotata
Coelonia fulvinotata nigrescens Basquin, 1992 (São Tomé and Príncipe)

References

Acherontiini
Moths of Africa
Moths of the Comoros
Moths of Mauritius
Moths of Réunion
Moths described in 1875